Paired amphipathic helix protein Sin3a is a protein that in humans is encoded by the SIN3A gene.

Function 

The protein encoded by this gene is a transcriptional regulatory protein. It contains paired amphipathic helix (PAH) domains, which are important for protein-protein interactions and may mediate repression by the Mad-Max complex.

Interactions 

SIN3A has been shown to interact with:

 CABIN1 
 HBP1,
 HDAC1, 
 HDAC9, 
 Histone deacetylase 2, 
 Host cell factor C1, 
 IKZF1, 
 ING1, 
 KLF11, 
 MNT, 
 MXD1, 
 Methyl-CpG-binding domain protein 2, 
 Nuclear receptor co-repressor 2, 
 OGT, 
 PHF12, 
 Promyelocytic leukemia protein, 
 RBBP4, 
 RBBP7, 
 SAP130, 
 SAP30, 
 SMARCA2, 
 SMARCA4, 
 SMARCC1, 
 SUDS3, 
 TAL1,  and
 Zinc finger and BTB domain-containing protein 16.

See also 
 Transcription coregulator

References

Further reading

External links 
 
 

Gene expression
Transcription coregulators